Live at the Beacon Theatre is a live concert DVD by the rock group the Allman Brothers Band. It was filmed at the Beacon Theatre, New York City on March 25–26, 2003 and released September 23, 2003. The DVD is certified Platinum in the United States by the RIAA.

Track listing

Disc 1
"Ain't Wastin' Time No More" (Gregg Allman)
"Black Hearted Woman" (Gregg Allman)
"Statesboro Blues" (Blind Willie McTell)
"Woman Across the River" (Betteye Crutcher, Allen Jones)
"A Change Is Gonna Come" (Sam Cooke)
"Maydell" (Warren Haynes, Johnny Neel)
"Come and Go Blues" (Gregg Allman)
"Rockin' Horse" (Gregg Allman, Warren Haynes, Allen Woody, Jack Pearson)
"Desdemona" (Gregg Allman, Warren Haynes)
"Don't Keep Me Wonderin'" (Gregg Allman)
"Midnight Rider" (Gregg Allman, Robert Payne)
"Soulshine" (Warren Haynes)
"High Cost of Low Living" (Gregg Allman, Warren Haynes, Jeff Anders, Ronnie Burgin)
"Leave My Blues at Home" (Gregg Allman)
"Old Before My Time" (Gregg Allman, Warren Haynes)
"The Same Thing" (Willie Dixon)
"Melissa" (Gregg Allman, Steve Alaimo)
"Instrumental Illness" (Warren Haynes, Oteil Burbridge)
"Worried Down with the Blues" (Warren Haynes, John Jaworowicz)
"Dreams" (Gregg Allman)
"Whipping Post" (Gregg Allman)

Disc 2 (Bonus Disc)
"One Way Out" (Elmore James, Marshall Sehorn, Sonny Boy Williamson II)
"Old Friend" - Warren Haynes and Derek Trucks Pre-Show Rehearsal (Warren Haynes, Chris Anderson)

Personnel

The Allman Brothers Band
Gregg Allman - vocals, keyboards
Oteil Burbridge - bass
Warren Haynes - vocals, guitar
Jaimoe - drums
Marc Quiñones - percussion
Butch Trucks - drums
Derek Trucks - guitar

Other personnel
Michael Drumm - director
Alicia Gelernt - producer
Chris Prinzivalli - audio engineer
Tim Fenoglio - camera operator
J.M. Hurley - video engineer
Tore Livia - jib operator
Tim Fenoglio - title designer
Josh Chasin - liner notes

Charts and certifications

References

External links
Official website

2003 live albums
2003 video albums
Live video albums
Sanctuary Records live albums
Sanctuary Records video albums
The Allman Brothers Band live albums
The Allman Brothers Band video albums